John J. O'Brien, Jr. (1916 – June 16, 1994) was an American professional basketball player. He played in the National Basketball League for the Akron Goodyear Wingfoots during the 1941–42 season. In 1952, he became a referee for the National Basketball Association. He died 6 days after Fellow Referee Earl Strom

References

1916 births
1994 deaths
Akron Goodyear Wingfoots players
All-American college men's basketball players
American Basketball League (1925–1955) coaches
American Basketball League (1925–1955) players
American men's basketball players
Basketball coaches from Connecticut
Basketball players from Connecticut
Deaths from cancer in Connecticut
Columbia Lions football players
Columbia Lions men's basketball players
Guards (basketball)
National Basketball Association referees